Ian Samuel Nekati (born 7 August 1989) is a Zimbabwean footballer who plays as a defender for Chicken Inn and the Zimbabwe national football team.

In 2022, Nekati moved to India and appeared with Calcutta Football League club United SC.

Career

Club
In 2013, Nekati joined F.C. Platinum, spending five years there but not failing to register consistent minutes, prompting a move to ZPC Kariba. Following the expiry of his contract with ZPC Kariba, Nekati was set to join South African club Cape Town City, but contract length disagreements halted the transfer. As a result, he remained in Zimbabwe, signing for Chicken Inn.

International
Nekati made his senior international debut on 4 August 2019 in a 3-1 victory over Mauritius during 2020 African Nations Championship qualification. For the 2020 African Nations Championship, Nekati was named as Zimbabwe's captain.

Career statistics

International

References

External links

1989 births
Living people
Zimbabwean footballers
Zimbabwe international footballers
Association football defenders
Sportspeople from Harare
F.C. Platinum players
Zimbabwe A' international footballers
2020 African Nations Championship players
Chicken Inn F.C. players
ZPC Kariba F.C. players